Hochfeld is a community in the Canadian province of Manitoba. It is located in the Rural Municipality of Stanley. The community was founded by Mennonites in 1875. The village is the birthplace of Canadian jazz guitarist Ed Bickert.

References

                                       
                                                                                                       

Unincorporated communities in Pembina Valley Region
Mennonitism in Manitoba